Wayne R. Smith was the Chief Statistician of Canada from 2010 to 16 September 2016. He was appointed interim Chief Statistician in 2010, after the controversial resignation of Munir Sheikh, and appointed Chief Statistician on 19 January 2011. Smith graduated with honours in Bachelor of Arts and a Master's degree in Economics at Carleton University in Ottawa, Ontario. He has worked for StatsCan since 1981. During his career at StatsCan, Smith has been the Director of the Communications Division, the Director of Special Surveys Division and Director General of Regional Operations Branch and the Assistant Chief Statistician, Communications and Operations. He was also the Assistant Chief Statistician of Business and Trade Statistics Field.

Smith resigned as the Chief Statistician of Canada unexpectedly on 16 September 2016. He resigned over issues regarding the lack of independence for the organization, specifically regarding issues with Shared Services Canada and the inability to operate to the agency's full potential.

Notes

References 

20th-century Canadian civil servants
21st-century Canadian civil servants
Carleton University alumni
People from Chilliwack
Year of birth missing (living people)
Living people